Sibylla of Anhalt (28 September 1564 – 26 October 1614) was a German princess from the House of Ascania who became Duchess of Württemberg as the wife of Duke Frederick I.

Life
Sibylla of Anhalt was born in Bernburgon 28 September 1564, as the fourth child of Joachim Ernest, Prince of Anhalt (1536–1586) and his first wife, Agnes of Barby-Mühlingen (1540–1569), daughter of Wolfgang I, Count of Barby-Mühlingen. She had three older sisters and two younger brothers. Sybilla lost her mother when she was five years old, and her father remarried two years later. By her stepmother, Eleonore of Württemberg (1552–1618), she had ten half-siblings.

In 1577, Sybilla's older sister Anna Maria was relieved from her post as Imperial abbess of Gernrode and Frose in order to marry Joachim Frederick of Brieg; under pressure from their father, the chapter elected the 13-year-old Sibylla as her successor. Sibylla was confirmed in her office by the emperor Rudolph II. During her reign as abbess, the only record of her activities comes from an abbey document in which she invested the widow of Stefan Molitor (the first Evangelical superintendent of the abbey) with a piece of land.

In 1581, Sibylla was relieved from her post in order to marry Frederick, Count of Mömpelgard and heir apparent of the Duchy of Württemberg. The marriage was arranged by her stepmother, Eleonore of Württemberg, and the wedding took place in Stuttgart on 22 May of that year. Her successor as abbess was her younger half-sister Agnes Hedwig. Sibylla bore her husband 15 children during the first 15 years of their marriage. Frederick succeeded his father's cousin Ludwig as Duke of Württemberg in 1593.

Only 16 years old at the time of her wedding, Sibylla was described as a beauty with a vivid charm, unpretentious and simple and with a disposition to be generous and kind, and her natural warm friendliness was said to have contrasted to the somewhat cold nature of Frederick. Through her strict Catholic upbringing, Sibylla was raised to endure any hardship of pregnancy and marriage without complaint, a role she fulfilled during her marriage. The relationship between Sibylla and Frederick has been described as happy, with Sibylla as a supporting and loyal wife. However, she did not play a prominent role in court life or have any political influence over her husband. Marital fidelity was not compatible with Frederick's view of the prerogatives of an absolutist monarch, and Sibylla accepted his infidelities without complaint. Sibylla's constant pregnancies drained her strength to such an extent that she was repeatedly confined to bed. After the birth of their last child, Sibylla and Frederick agreed to stop having sex so that she would not become pregnant again. After this, the couple virtually lived apart, and Frederick did not take Sybilla with him on his frequent travels to France, Italy, and England. 

Sibylla was anxious to expand her knowledge of botany and chemistry. To veil her interest in the dubious discipline of alchemy, she explained her activity as gathering an herbal collection for the production of medicine for the poor. As scientific adviser, she appointed Helena Magenbuch, a daughter of Johann Magenbuch, the personal physician of Martin Luther and Emperor Charles V. Helena Magenbuch was awarded the title of Pharmacist of the Württemberg Court. From 1606 to 1607, Maria Andreae took over this post.

After the death of her husband in 1608, Sibylla withdrew to Leonberg, where she commissioned the architect Heinrich Schickhardt to develop Schloss Leonberg and create the famous Pomeranzengarten (Orange Garden) in Renaissance style. In 1609, Schickhardt built a lakeside house not far from Leonberg (Seehaus Leonberg) that was used as a hunting lodge. Sibylla died in Leonberg in 1614.

Issue 
 Johann Frederick (1582–1628)
 George Frederick (1583–1591)
 Sibylla Elisabeth (1584–1606), who married John George I, Elector of Saxony
 Elisabeth (born and died in 1585)
 Louis Frederick (1586–1631), founder of the branch of Württemberg-Mömpelgard
 Joachim Frederick (born and died in 1587)
 Julius Frederick (1588–1635), founder of the branch of Württemberg-Weiltingen, also known as the Julian Line
 Philip Frederick (born and died in 1589)
 Eva Christina (1590–1657), who married married John George of Brandenburg (1577–1624), Duke of Jägerndorf, son of Joachim Frederick, Elector of Brandenburg
 Frederick Achilles (1591–1631)
 Agnes (1592–1629), who married Francis Julius of Saxe-Lauenburg (1584–1634)
 Barbara (1593–1627), who married Margrave Frederick V of Baden-Durlach
 Magnus (1594–1622), who fell in the Battle of Wimpfen
 August (born and died in 1596)
 Anna (1597–1650)

References

1564 births
1614 deaths
People from Bernburg
Duchesses of Württemberg
House of Ascania
Gernrode
Burials at Stiftskirche, Stuttgart
Daughters of monarchs